Feroz Abbas Khan is an Indian theatre and film director, playwright and screenwriter, who is most known for directing plays like Mughal-e-Azam, Saalgirah, Tumhari Amrita (1992), Salesman Ramlal and Gandhi Viruddh Gandhi.

Career
He was the first artistic director of the Prithvi Theatre in Mumbai and in 1983 was head of the Prithvi Theatre Festival with Jennifer Kapoor and Akash Khurana. He started with productions like the early comedy All the Best and Saalgirah (1993), written by playwright Javed Siddiqui with Anupam Kher and Kirron Kher, which incidentally became her first acting performance during her comeback after a sabbatical. In 1992, American playwright and novelist, A. R. Gurney's play Love Letters was adapted to Urdu as Tumhari Amrita and given an Indian context by Javed Siddiqi. It was performed by veteran actors Shabana Azmi and Farooq Sheikh at the Jennifer Kapoor Festival in Prithvi theatre in February 1992 for the first time. For one-and-a-half hours, the actors read the letters describing the relationship between two friends Amrita and Zulfikar over a period of 35 years. For the next 21 years till Farooque Shaikh's death in December 2013, this immensely successful play went on to tour many parts of the world including US, Europe and Pakistan.

Khan's production of Peter Shaffer's satirical comedy, The Royal Hunt of the Sun and the contemporary Indian adaptation of Arthur Miller's classic Death of a Salesman, 'Salesman Ramlal' (1997), starring actor-director Satish Kaushik are important plays of Indian theatre. Next came English theatre production of Mahatma v/s Gandhi, based on relationship between Mahatma Gandhi and his son, Harilal Gandhi.

In 2007, he made his film debut with Gandhi, My Father, based on his one previous play, Mahatma vs Gandhi, and opened to critical acclaim. At the National Film Award, actor Darshan Zariwala won the Best Supporting Actor Award, for his role of Gandhi, while the film itself won the Special Jury Award and Best Screenplay and the Best Screenplay Award at the Asia Pacific Screen Awards and nominated for Grand Prix at Tokyo Film Festival.

Also in 2007, he added Abbas as his middle name to avoid confusion with Bollywood actor-director, Feroze Khan.

While, his play, Salesman Ramlal was revived in 2009, with a more contemporary version, another classic, Tumhari Amrita was performed for no less than 21 years till December 2013 when main actor Farooque Shaikh died. The last show was held in the Taj Mahal, Agra.

In 2016, he directed Mughal-e-Azam, a Broadway-style musical based on the 1960 Bollywood film Mughal-e-Azam, which was directed by K. Asif and produced by Shapoorji Pallonji.  The musical was produced jointly by Shapoorji Pallonji Group and the National Centre for the Performing Arts (India).

In March 2023, Khan will open his Civilization to Nation: The Journey of Our Nation in the new 2,000-seat Grand Theatre at Mumbai's Jio World Centre.

Plays
 Raunaq & Jassi  
 All the Best  	 	 	 	 	 	
 Eva Mumbai Ma Chaal Jaiye
 Saalgirah – Anupam Kher & Kirron Kher							
 The Royal Hunt of the Sun 		
 Tumhari Amrita (1992) – Shabana Azmi & Farooq Sheikh				
 Mahatma vs Gandhi (1998)
 Salesman Ramlal (1999) – Satish Kaushik
 Kuch Bhi Ho Sakta Hai – Anupam Kher
 Dinner With Friends (2011) (Tisca Chopra, Vinay Jain, Joy Sengupta & Perizaad Zorabian Irani)

Filmography
Gandhi, My Father (2007)
Dekh Tamasha Dekh(2014)

References

External links
 Feroz Khan, Official Webpage
 

1959 births
Living people
Film directors from Mumbai
Indian theatre directors
Indian male dramatists and playwrights
Hindi-language film directors
Indian male screenwriters
20th-century Indian film directors
Best Original Screenplay National Film Award winners